The Merchant is a 1976 play in two acts by the English dramatist Arnold Wesker. It is based on William Shakespeare's The Merchant of Venice, and focus on the Jewish Shylock character, that play's principal antagonist.

Wesker began writing the play after seeing a 1973 performance by Laurence Olivier. It premiered in Stockholm in 1976 and was later renamed Shylock. The play was meant to premiere on Broadway in 1977, but the Broadway production was cancelled due to the death of the plays' lead, multiple Tony Award winner Zero Mostel. Wesker had high hopes that the play would make a big profit, but this did not happen. He wrote a book about the play in 1999, The Birth of Shylock and the Death of Zero Mostel.

In this play, Shylock is a good man and the good friend of Antonio, the title character in Shakespeare's play. They bond in their love of knowledge and mutual dislike of the antisemitism in their community. Shylock's demand for a pound of flesh is meant as a jest, but he can not retract it. Both Shylock and Antonio are relieved when the demand is denied in court.

Reviewing The Merchant, critic Michael Billington wrote "Wesker’s point comes across clearly: that anti-Jewish prejudice is ingrained in English life." John Gross, another critic, stated that "As a humanistic sermon, The Merchant has much to recommend it. As a play, it lacks bite".

See also
Shylock, a play by Mark Leiren-Young

References 

Plays by Arnold Wesker
Plays set in the 16th century
Plays set in Italy
Works based on The Merchant of Venice
1976 plays